Ebrahimi (also Romanized as Ebrāhīmī; also known as Ibrāhīmī) is a village in Keybar Rural District, Jolgeh Zozan District, Khaf County, Razavi Khorasan Province, Iran. At the 2006 census, its population was 763, in 169 families.

References 

Populated places in Khaf County